MK Capital is a $250 million venture capital fund with headquarters in Chicago and offices in Los Angeles  and Ann Arbor. MK Capital offers multi-stage growth equity and venture capital to companies in the following sectors: digital media, data center automation, application software, education technology, and technology-enabled services. Representative investments include: Movieclips, HealthiNation, Machinama, BladeLogic, Kontiki, TopSchool, and Playcast Media.

On May 5, 2008, MK Capital announced it had completed the acquisition of Kontiki from VeriSign.

On April 22, 2011, MK Capital announced that it has sold Smoothstone IP Communications, founded by Jeff Wellemeyer, to West Corporation for $120 million.

References

Companies based in Chicago
Venture capital firms of the United States